Songline ( foaled 4 March 2018) is a Japanese Thoroughbred racehorse. She showed some promise as a two-year-old in 2022 when she won a maiden race on the second of her two starts. She developed into a high-class miler in the following year, winning the Kobai Stakes and Fuji Stakes as well as running second in the NHK Mile Cup. In 2022 she improved again and recorded major successes in the 1351 Turf Sprint and Yasuda Kinen.

Background

Songline is a brown mare with a white blaze and white socks on her hind legs bred in Japan by Northern Farm. She was sent into training with Toru Hayashi and races in the black, yellow and red colours of the Northern Farm associate Sunday Racing.

She was from the second crop of foals sired by Kizuna whose wins included the Tokyo Yushun, Prix Niel and Osaka Hai. His other foals have included Akai Ito and Deep Bond. Songline's dam Luminous Parade showed solid racing ability, winning four minor races from twenty-three starts on dirt in Japan. Luminous Parade's granddam Soninke, a British broodmare who was exported to Japan in 2001 was also the female-line ancestor of Logi Universe and Deirdre. Soninke was in turn a daughter of the outstanding racemare Sonic Lady who was not, technically, a Thoroughbred as her female ancestry could not be traced to one of the foundation mares of the breed.

Racing career

2020: two-year-old season
Songline began her track career in a contest for previously unraced juveniles over 1400 metres on good ground at Tokyo Racecourse on 20 June when she started the 1.6/1 favourite and finished second to Cool Cat, beaten two lengths by the winner. After a five-month break she returned for a maiden race over 1600 metres at Tokyo on 22 November and started the 2.1/1 second favourite in an eighteen-runner field. Ridden by Genki Maruyama she raced in mid-division before staying on strongly down the centre of the track, overtaking the favourite Tosen Melanie inside the last 200 metres and drawing away to win by three lengths.

2021: three-year-old season
On her three-year-old debut Songline was stepped up in class for the Listed Kobai Stakes over 1400 metres at Chukyo Racecourse on 16 January when she was ridden by Christophe Lemaire and went off the 1.9/1 favourite against ten other fillies. She raced in third place, went to the front approaching the last 200 metres and went clear of her rivals to win by three lengths from La La Christine. Toru Hayashi commented "she ran an impeccable race. She was able to get a good position despite the fast pace and gained ground in the final stage". The filly was then elevated to Grade 1 class for the 1600 metre Oka Sho on 11 April at Hanshin Racecourse and started at odds of 13.7/1. She was never in serious contention and came home fifteenth of the eighteen runners behind Sodashi, beaten twelve lengths by the winner. Hayashi reported that there was "nothing amiss" with his trainee but suggested that she may have been unsuited by the right-handed track. Four weeks after her run in the Oka Sho Songline was matched against male opposition in the Grade 1 NHK Mile Cup in which she was ridden by Kenichi Ikezoe and started at odds of 15.9/1 in an eighteen-runner field. She raced just behind the leaders, made a strong run on the outside in the straight and gained the advantage from the favourite Grenadier Guards 200 metres from the finish only to be run down in the final stride and beaten a nose by Schnell Meister.

After a break of more than three months Songline returned in the Grade 3 Sekiya Kinen over 1600 metres at Niigata Racecourse in she faced older horses. She started the odds-on favourite but finished third behind the four-year-old filly Lotus Land and the five-year-old horse Karate. On 23 October at Tokyo, with Ikezoe in the saddle, Songline contested the Grade 2 Fuji Stakes and started the 2.9/1 favourite against seventeen opponents including the previous Group 1 winners Danon The Kid, Wagnerian and Lauda Sion. After racing in mid-division she produced a sustained run down the centre of the straight, took the lead 200 metres from the finish and held off the late challenge of Satono Wizard to win by a neck. On her final run of the year the filly started favourite for the 1400 metre Hanshin Cup in December but ran poorly and finished thirteenth behind Grenadier Guards.

2022: four-year-old season

For her first run of 2022 Songline was sent to Saudi Arabia to contest the $1.5 million 1351 Sprint Cup over 1400 metres at King Abdulaziz Racecourse in Riyadh where she was ridden by Lemaire and started 5/1 second favourite behind Naval Crown. After racing in mid-division she made sustained progress in the straight, got the better of the British filly Happy Romance in the last 100 metres and held of the late run of the American challenger Casa Creed to win by a neck. Hayashi commented "She is such a brilliant filly and the ride from Lemaire was perfect. The owners also deserve great credit for their ambition in coming here. Last year she raced well in this counter-clockwise direction and she has a lot of natural speed so we thought we could run well coming back in distance a little."

Songline's first appearance of the year in Japan came at Tokyo on 15 May when she started 4.4/1 second favourite for the Grade 1 Victoria Mile. She raced in ninth place before making steady progress in the straight but never looked likely to win and came home fifth, two and a half lengths behind the winner Sodashi. Hayashi felt that she had been unsuited by the slow early pace. Ikezoe took the ride when the filly started the 7.2/1 fourth choice in the betting for the Grade 1 Yasuda Kinen over the same course and distance three weeks later. The four-year-old Elusive Panther started favourite while the other contenders included Cafe Pharoah, Salios, Danon The Kid, Schnell Meister and Naran Huleg (Takamatsunomiya Kinen). She settled behind the leaders as Ho O Amazon set the pace before moving on the outside on the final turn and making rapid progress in the straight. She took the lead from Salios 100 metres from the finish and held on to win by a neck from Schnell Meister. After the race Ikezoe said "It was a tight schedule for the filly but the staff at the stables prepared her remarkably. She broke well and I decided to settle her behind Salios... Trying not to make the same mistake as last time, we made an early bid before the last corner and she responded well and stretched all the way for a strong finish".

Pedigree

 Songline was inbred 3 × 4 to Sunday Silence, meaning that this stallion appears in both the third and fourth generations of her pedigree.

References

2018 racehorse births
Racehorses bred in Japan
Racehorses trained in Japan
Thoroughbred family B3